Beam of Prism is the debut extended play by South Korean girl group Viviz. It consists of seven tracks, including the lead single "Bop Bop!". The extended play was released by BPM Entertainment on February 9, 2022.

Background and release
On October 6, 2021, it was announced that Eunha, SinB, and Umji, who were former members of GFriend, has signed with BPM Entertainment and would be debuting as a trio. On January 24, 2022, BPM Entertainment announced the trio would be making their debut on February 9, 2022, with the release of their first extended play Beam of Prism. Two days later, the promotional schedule was released. On January 29, the mood sampler video was released. On February 2, the track listing was released with "Bop Bop!" announced as the lead single. Four days later, the highlight teaser video was released. The music video teasers for "Bop Bop!" were released on February 7 and 8.

Composition
"Bop Bop!" was described as a "hybrid" pop dance song with "latin-style rhythm and disco [rhythm]" with lyrics about "[the group's] aspiration to enjoy music". "Fiesta" was described as a "retro" pop song with "light atmosphere". "Tweet Tweet" was described as a song with "bold lyrics" characterized by "impressive, unique, and fun [rhythm]". "Lemonade" was described as a R&B song with "[rhythm] that are reminiscent of [the] 90s". "Love You Like" was described  as a song in the alternative pop genre with "repetitive chorus" characterized by "the members' simple vocals" with lyrics about "the members' gratitude and love to [their] long-awaited fans". Umji also participated in writing of "Love You Like". "Mirror" was described as a song with "emotional orchestral arrangements and lyrical melodies".

Commercial performance
Beam of Prism debuted at number two on South Korea's Gaon Album Chart in the chart issue dated February 6–12, 2022; on the monthly chart, the extended play debuted at number eight in the chart issue for February 2022 with 50,000 copies sold. In Japan, the extended play debuted number 42 on the Oricon Albums Chart in the chart issue dated February 28, 2022.

Track listing

Notes
 "Bop Bop!" is stylized in all caps.

Charts

Weekly charts

Monthly charts

Release history

References

Viviz albums
2022 debut EPs
Korean-language EPs